Lupitidine (INN; lupitidine hydrochloride (USAN); development code SKF-93479) is a long-acting H2 receptor antagonist developed by Smith, Kline & French and described as an antiulcerogenic that was never marketed. It was shown to inhibit nocturnal gastric acid secretion and, in experiments on rodents, produced diffuse neuroendocrine cell hyperplasia and an increase in multifocal glandular hyperplasia due to hypergastrinemia resulting from the pharmacological suppression of gastric acid secretion.

References 

Dimethylamino compounds
Furans
H2 receptor antagonists
Thioethers
Pyridines
Pyrimidones
Abandoned drugs